The ITEC Maverick is a powered parachute aircraft with a roadable fuselage.

Design and development
Equipped with the largest powered parachute certified by the FAA, the Maverick received experimental aircraft airworthiness certification on April 14, 2008, with N-Number 356MV.

Capable of interstate speeds on pavement, the Maverick's dune buggy-like frame of chromoly tubing gives it the ability to be used off-road. Additionally, the vehicle can deploy a parafoil and fly as a powered parachute. It weighs about 1100 pounds and has a useful carrying capacity equivalent to a Cessna 172 (fuel and 550 pounds cargo). With a 22-foot mast, the Maverick can take off and land in weather conditions that other powered parachutes would not be able to safely operate in. The developer, Steve Saint has said he envisions the Maverick being useful to the Huaorani and other Indian groups, farmers and ranchers, pipeline inspection crews and anyone else with a requirement to traverse rough, roadless ground. Popular Mechanics gave it their Breakthrough Award in 2009. In 2012, the Maverick was accepted by the United States FAA to operate as an Experimental homebuilt, S-LSA, or E-LSA.

Project status
There were two accidents – in which there were no deaths – involving the parachute wing.  Due to insufficient resources to re-engineer the wing, development of the Maverick has been concluded. ITEC is seeking a buyer that will continue development of the aircraft.

Variants
Maverick URVATV (Ultimate Roadable, All-Terrain, Aerial Vehicle)
Initial model
Maverick HPAV (High Performance Aerial Vehicle)
Transaxle removed, fan drive only
Maverick HPRATV (High-Performance, Roadable, All-Terrain Vehicle )
Wheel drive only, convertible to flight.
Maverick XTRV (Xtreme Roadable Vehicle)
 wheel drive only.

Specifications (Maverick)

References

External links 

 Maverick project web page

Homebuilt aircraft
Powered parachutes
Roadable aircraft